The 1982 Cologne Cup, also known as the Cologne Grand Prix, was a men's tennis tournament played on indoor carpet courts at the Sporthalle in Cologne, West Germany that was part of the 1982 Volvo Grand Prix circuit. It was the seventh edition of the tournament and was held from 25 October through 31 October 1982. Fourth-seeded Kevin Curren won the singles title.

Finals

Singles
 Kevin Curren defeated  Shlomo Glickstein 2–6, 6–2, 6–3
 It was Curren's only singles title of the year and the 2nd of his career.

Doubles
 José Luis Damiani /  Carlos Kirmayr defeated  Hans-Dieter Beutel /  Christoph Zipf 6–2, 3–6, 7–5

References

External links
 ITF – tournament edition details

Cologne Cup
Cologne Cup